The West Virginia Senate is the upper house of the West Virginia Legislature.
There are seventeen senatorial districts. Each district has two senators who serve staggered four-year terms. Although the Democratic Party held a supermajority in the Senate as recently as 2015, Republicans now dominate in the chamber, and holds 31 seats to the Democrats' three seats.

Organization
Senators are elected for terms of four years that are staggered, meaning that only a portion of the 34 state senate seats are up every election.

The state legislature meets on the second Wednesday of January each year and conducts a 60-day regular session.

Legislative process
Unlike most state senates, the West Virginia Senate can introduce revenue bills. Bills must undergo three readings in each house before being sent to the governor. Bills are drafted by the Office of Legislative Services or legislative staff counsel, reviewed by the sponsor of the bill and submitted for introduction. Bills are assigned to committees that make recommendations about a bill in the form of a committee report.

Bills approved in both the West Virginia Senate and West Virginia House of Delegates are then submitted to the governor, who has the power to sign them into law or veto them. The state legislature can override the veto, unless they have already adjourned.

Districts

The state is divided into 17 districts, with each electing a senator for a four-year term every two years. Thus each district contains about 1/17th of the state's population, or about 105,000 persons.

The state's districting system is unique in the United States in that both senators from a district cannot be from the same county, no matter the population of the various parts of the district. This means, for example, that one of the 5th District's two senators must reside in Cabell County and the other must reside in the portion of Wayne County that is inside the 5th District, even though Cabell County has more people than the portion of Wayne County that is part of the 5th District. However, both senators are elected by everybody within the district, not just by the people of the county in which the senators reside.

Responding to the 2010 Census the Senate redistricted itself. Kanawha County was divided for the first time in the Senate's history, with the northern and western portions joining a part of Putnam County as the 8th District and the remainder of the county constituting the 17th district on its own. This reduced the number of Senators from Kanawha County from four to three, as one of the 8th's had to be a resident of Putnam.

Responding to the 2020 Census the Senate again redistricted itself. The Senate adopted a new map, again reflecting a shift of the population to the Morgantown area and the Eastern Panhandle. Ten counties, out of the 55, were divided between two different districts, and Kanawha County was divided between three different districts.

Because senators are elected for four-year terms, the redistricting will not come fully into effect until after the 2024 election, with 17 senators to be elected under the new map in 2022, while those elected in 2020 under the old map will continue to serve until 2024.

Senate president

The Senate elects its own president from its membership. Craig Blair is currently the president of the West Virginia Senate.

While the West Virginia Constitution does not create or even mention the title of lieutenant governor, West Virginia Code 6A-1-4 creates this designation for the Senate president, who stands first in the line of succession to the office of governor. As stated in Article 7 Section 16 of the constitution: "In case of the death, conviction or impeachment, failure to qualify, resignation, or other disability of the governor, the president of the Senate shall act as governor until the vacancy is filled, or the disability removed." However, the Senate President may not always serve the remainder of the term as the constitution also states: "Whenever a vacancy shall occur in the office of governor before the first three years of the term shall have expired, a new election for governor shall take place to fill the vacancy."

Current composition

86th Legislature (2023–2024)

Leadership of the 86th West Virginia Senate

Committee Chairs and Vice Chairs

Members of the 86th West Virginia Senate

See also
List of presidents of the West Virginia Senate

References

External links
West Virginia Legislature – official website
Project Vote Smart – State Senate of West Virginia

West Virginia Legislature
State upper houses in the United States